Wenona may refer to:

Locations
In the United States:
 Wenona, Georgia, a census-designated place
 Wenona, Illinois, a city
 Wenona, Maryland, an unincorporated community on Deal Island in Somerset County
 Wenona, Michigan, a historic settlement, now part of Bay City
 East Wenona, Illinois, a former village

Other uses
 Wenona School, an independent, day and boarding school for girls in North Sydney, New South Wales, Australia
 A taxonomic synonym for Charina, a genus of boas found in Africa and North America

See also 
 Wenonah (disambiguation)
 Winona (disambiguation)